Francisco Isaías Lemus Muñoz Ledo (born 23 February 1961) is a Mexican politician affiliated with the National Action Party.In 2003 he was Deputy plurinominal Local PAN in Guanajuato LVIII Legislature . President of the Commission of Public Works and Urban Development ; Member of the Commission of Education, Culture and Publishing Affairs ; Member of the Committee on Environment and Ecology. As of 2014 he served as Deputy of the LIX Legislature of the Mexican Congress representing Guanajuato, 1991 candidate for alderman of the municipality of Apaseo El Grande, Guanajuato 1994 candidate for mayor of Apaseo El Grande, Guanajuato, PAN 1996 active members, 1997 PAN candidate of a local deputy Guanajuato, from 1997 to 2000 Secretary of organization of CDM PAN Apaseo el Grande, Guanajuato, from 1997 to 2002 Political Advisor in the CDM PAN Apaseo el Grande, Guanajuato, from 2001 to 2003 State Counsel in the CDE PAN in Leon, Guanajuato

References

1961 births
Living people
Politicians from Guanajuato
National Action Party (Mexico) politicians
Members of the Chamber of Deputies (Mexico) for Guanajuato